Leonardo Miramar Rocha (born 23 May 1997) is a Portuguese professional footballer who plays for Polish club Radomiak Radom as a forward.

Football career
Born in Almada to a Brazilian father, Rocha represented nine different clubs during his youth career, and finished his formation with AS Monaco FC. He made his senior debut with the B-team on 26 November 2016, playing the last 11 minutes in a 2–1 loss against US Colomiers for the CFA championship.

Rocha terminated his contract with Monaco on 30 January 2017, and joined Serie B side Vicenza Calcio on 1 February. He did not play for the club during his six-month spell, and subsequently moved to Spain with CD Leganés, being assigned to the reserves in Tercera División.

Rocha scored his first senior goal on 1 October 2017, scoring his team's third in a 3–1 home defeat of CDF Tres Cantos. The following 31 January, after three goals in ten matches, he was loaned to Segunda División B side Ontinyent CF until June.

On 19 July 2018, Rocha switched teams and countries again after signing for Lommel SK in the Belgian First Division B. He made his professional debut on 3 August, starting in a 1–0 home win against Royale Union Saint-Gilloise.

Rocha scored his first professional goal on 17 August 2018, netting a last-minute winner in a 2–1 away success over KV Mechelen. On 6 October, he scored a hat-trick in a 3–1 home win against K.S.V. Roeselare. He finished the campaign with 19 goals, being the division's top goalscorer as his side narrowly avoided relegation.

Remaining in Belgium, Rocha signed a three-year contract with First Division A side KAS Eupen on 23 July 2019. The fee was €500,000. In 2020–21, he was loaned back to the second tier at RWDM47 where he was the club's top scorer. On 10 October 2020, he scored a hat-trick for the Molenbeek-based club in an 8–1 win at Union Rochefortoise in the fifth round of the national cup.

On 16 August 2022, Rocha signed a two-year contract with Lierse.

On 13 January 2023, Rocha joined Polish Ekstraklasa side Radomiak Radom until June 2026, becoming their record signing for a reported fee of approximately €150,000.

Career statistics

Honours

Individual
Belgian First Division B Top goalscorer: 2018–19

References

External links

1997 births
Sportspeople from Almada
Portuguese people of Brazilian descent
Living people
Portuguese footballers
Association football forwards
AS Monaco FC players
L.R. Vicenza players
CD Leganés B players
Ontinyent CF players
Lommel S.K. players
K.A.S. Eupen players
RWDM47 players
Lierse Kempenzonen players
Radomiak Radom players
Championnat National 2 players
Segunda División B players
Tercera División players
Belgian Pro League players
Challenger Pro League players
Ekstraklasa players
Portuguese expatriate footballers
Expatriate footballers in Italy
Portuguese expatriate sportspeople in Italy
Expatriate footballers in Brazil
Portuguese expatriate sportspeople in Brazil
Expatriate footballers in Monaco
Portuguese expatriate sportspeople in Monaco
Expatriate footballers in Spain
Portuguese expatriate sportspeople in Spain
Expatriate footballers in Belgium
Portuguese expatriate sportspeople in Belgium
Expatriate footballers in Poland
Portuguese expatriate sportspeople in Poland